USS Princeton (CG-59) is a  guided missile cruiser serving in the United States Navy. Armed with naval guns and anti-air, anti-surface, and anti-submarine missiles, plus other weapons, she is equipped for surface-to-air, surface-to-surface, and anti-submarine warfare. She was previously home to two SH-60B LAMPS Mk III Seahawk helicopters and now carries a pair of the MH-60R version of the Seahawk. This warship is named for the Revolutionary War victories over the British by George Washington in and around the town of Princeton, New Jersey.

Princeton was the first Ticonderoga-class cruiser to carry the upgraded AN/SPY-1B radar system.

Operational history

The ship was commissioned on 11 February 1989 in the Ingalls shipyard in Pascagoula, Mississippi. After traveling through the Panama Canal, Princeton was home-ported at the Long Beach Naval Shipyard, California.

Vladivostok port visit
In 1990, Princeton served as the flagship for the first US Navy visit to the Soviet Union's Pacific port of Vladivostok since before World War II. Before the visit was completed, the crew received word that their Pacific cruise was canceled. They returned to Long Beach and joined the  Battle Group preparing to deploy to the Persian Gulf.

Mine strike

At exactly 7:15 AM local time two Italian-made MN103 Manta bottom-mounted influence mines detonated, one just under the port rudder and the other just forward of the starboard bow, the second explosion most likely being a sympathetic detonation caused by the first. The blasts cracked the superstructure, buckled three lines in the hull, jammed the port rudder, flooded the #3 switchboard room through chilled water pipe cracks, and damaged the starboard propeller shaft. Three crewmembers were injured, one seriously. Despite the severe damage, the forward weapons and the AEGIS combat system were back online within 15 minutes.

At great peril, the Canadian destroyer  moved north through the minefield to deliver damage-control supplies to the severely damaged Princeton, which remained on station for 31 hours until she was relieved. Princetons commanding officer, Captain Edward Hontz, specifically requested the assistance of Athabaskan despite the latter not originally assigned to the area. Unlike most ships of her size, Athabaskan could simultaneously operate two large CH-124 Sea King helicopters, which could search out mines for long periods. As a gesture of solidarity, Athabaskan winched over several cases of beer for the crew of Princeton, since United States Navy vessels were dry.

Princeton, which suffered from a locked starboard propeller shaft and a locked port rudder, was guided through the minefield by the minesweeper . Temporary repairs were conducted first in Bahrain, and then in the port of Jebel Ali near Dubai by the duty destroyer tender , and finally in a Dubai drydock. After eight weeks, Princeton returned to the United States under the ship's power for additional repairs. The ship and her crew were awarded the Combat Action Ribbon.

Captain Edward Hontz turned over command to Captain J. Cutler Dawson before moving on to command the Aegis Training Command in Dahlgren, Virginia. Future Chief of Naval Operations, Michael M. Gilday was serving aboard Princeton as an officer during the ordeal, and was awarded the Navy Commendation Medal with Valor for his actions.

When the U.S. Naval Base in Long Beach was closed due to BRAC action, the home port of Princeton was moved to the Naval Base San Diego. Princeton was overhauled from 1999 to 2000 in San Diego, California. In 2003, the ship was assigned to Carrier Strike Group Three.

Princeton aerial object incident
While training in the Pacific Ocean, in November 2004 Princeton tracked unidentified flying objects that were capable of accelerating and maneuvering at extraordinary speeds. Princeton subsequently contacted two Navy F/A-18F fighters from  who tracked and filmed their interactions with the objects. The incident was publicly disclosed in December 2017 with the revelation of the funding of the Advanced Aerospace Threat Identification Program.

Hamid rescue
On 21 July 2005, Princeton responded to a radio call from an Iranian dhow, named Hamid, that was dead in the water and in need of engineering assistance. A rescue and assistance team was dispatched to Hamid where it was determined that the engine would not start due to corroded batteries that were low on power. The batteries were removed and brought back to Princeton for maintenance, cleaning and recharging. Princeton rescue team restored power onboard Hamid, restarted the engines, and then provided minor medical assistance and fresh water to the dhow's crew.

Man overboard incident
In 2005, the warship was acting as an escort for Carrier Strike Group Eleven, led by Nimitz, and was featured in the documentary Carrier. While in the Persian Gulf on the night of 12 September 2005, or the early morning of 13 September, during the filming of the documentary, a sailor fell overboard. Despite a search lasting over five days, and covering a  area, the sailor was not found.

Magellan Star
In September 2010, Princeton was involved in the rescue of the hostages aboard the pirated  in the Gulf of Aden.

Awards
 Combat Action Ribbon – (Jan-Feb 1991)
 Joint Meritorious Unit Award – (Jan-Dec 1997)
 Navy Unit Commendation – (Jan-Feb 1991, 16-20 Dec 1998, Sep-Dec 2001, Jan-May 2003)
 Navy Meritorious Unit Commendation – (Jul-Nov 2010, Sep-Nov 2013)
 Battle "E" – (1991, 1992, 1993, 1995, 1996, 1999, 2001, 2003, 2008, 2010, 2013)
 Southwest Asia Service Medal – (Jan-Apr 1991)
 Spokane Trophy Award – (2003, 2017)

References

External links
 Official web site
 USS Princeton webpage
 USS Princeton – CG 59 – Military.com

 

Ticonderoga-class cruisers
Ships built in Pascagoula, Mississippi
1987 ships
Cold War cruisers of the United States
Gulf War ships of the United States
Maritime incidents in 1991
Cruisers of the United States